Sabalito is a district of the Coto Brus canton, in the Puntarenas province of Costa Rica.

History 
Sabalito was created on 10 December 1965 by Ley 3598.

Geography 
Sabalito has an area of  km² and an elevation of  metres.

Demographics 

For the 2011 census, Sabalito had a population of  inhabitants.

Transportation

Road transportation 
The district is covered by the following road routes:
 National Route 613
 National Route 617

Economy
The local population is mostly employed by the local ranches and farms or in other manual labor.

References 

Districts of Puntarenas Province
Populated places in Puntarenas Province